Aldermaston Gravel Pits is a    biological Site of Special Scientific Interest north of Aldermaston in Berkshire. It was purchased by Natural England in 2003.

This site consists of mature flooded gravel workings surrounded by dense fringing vegetation, trees and scrub, affording a variety of habitats for breeding birds and a refuge for wildfowl. The irregular shoreline, with islands, promontories, sheltered eutrophic pools and narrow lagoons provides undisturbed habitat for many water birds including surface feeding ducks such as teal (Anas crecca) and shoveler (Anas clypeata). The surrounding marsh and scrub are important for numerous birds including nine breeding species of warblers, water rails (Rallus aquaticus), kingfishers (Alcedoa atthis) and an important breeding colony of nightingales (Luscinia megarhynchos).

References

Kennet and Avon Canal
Nature reserves in Berkshire
Sites of Special Scientific Interest in Berkshire
West Berkshire District
Aldermaston
Quarrying in the United Kingdom